The place name Peters Creek in the U.S. state of Alaska may refer to:

 A major portion of Chugiak, Anchorage, a collection of neighborhoods and historically separate community in the Municipality of Anchorage
 An alternate name for Petersville, Alaska, a census-designated place in the Matanuska-Susitna Borough